Twenge is a surname. Notable people with this surname include:
Jean Twenge (born 1971), American psychologist
John Twenge (1319–1379), English saint